The Distributed Social Networking Protocol (DSNP) allows everyone to collaborate to create one social network that is decentralized, like email. 

It is an open technology that supports private communications in a manner that users of modern social networks have come to expect. The current version of the protocol is 0.6, though the project has been discontinued. The leading author is Adrian Thurston.

See also
Distributed social network

References

External links
 DSNP: Distributed Social Networking Protocol
 Mailing list archive
 GitHub repository

Social networks
Distributed computing architecture
Social networking services
Open formats
Application layer protocols